Salem Al-Eedi (Arabic:سالم العيدي) (born 24 June 1994) is an Emirati footballer who plays as a defender.

Career
Al-Eedi started his career at Al-Jazira and is a product of the Al-Jazira's youth system Where he moved to him from Ajman's youth in 2011 . On 22 September 2017, Al-Eedi made his professional debut for Al-Jazira against Dibba Al-Fujairah in the Pro League.

External links

References

1994 births
Living people
Emirati footballers
Ajman Club players
Al Jazira Club players
Khor Fakkan Sports Club players
Emirates Club players
UAE Pro League players
Association football defenders
Place of birth missing (living people)